Linnaeus's two-toed sloth (Choloepus didactylus), also known as the southern two-toed sloth, unau, or Linne's two-toed sloth is a species of sloth from South America, found in Venezuela, the Guyanas, Colombia, Ecuador, Peru, and Brazil north of the Amazon River. There is now evidence suggesting the species' range expands into Bolivia.

Phylogeny 
Sloths belong to the order Pilosa, which also includes anteaters. They belong to the super order Xenarthra, which includes the Cingulata. Xenarthra are edentate or toothless. They lack incisors and have a large reduction in number of teeth with only four to five sets remaining including canines.

Modern sloths are divided into two families based on the number of toes on their front feet, Choloepodidae and Bradypodidae. Linnaeus's two-toed sloth and Hoffmann's two-toed sloth (Choloepus hoffmanni) belong to the family Choloepodidae, which included extinct ground sloths.

Morphology 
Choloepus didactylus are larger than three-toed sloths. They have longer hair, bigger eyes, and their back and front legs are more equal in length. Their ears, hind feet and head are generally larger than Bradypodidae. They do however have a shorter tail. Their shoulder height, the height from the shoulder blade to the tips of the claw is longer than three-toed sloths, indicating longer arms.

The species has relatively few teeth; it has four to five sets including canines and lacks incisors.  The teeth lack enamel, consisting only of two layers ever-growing dentin. Supernumerary teeth have occasionally been observed, but this has been reported in almost all mammalian orders.

Ecology 
C. didactylus is a solitary, nocturnal and arboreal animal, found in rainforests. The two-toed sloth falls prey to wild cats such as the ocelot and jaguar as well as large birds of prey such as the harpy and crested eagles. Predation mainly occurs when the sloth descends to the ground in order to defecate or change trees. Anacondas have also been known to hunt sloths. It is able to swim, making it possible to cross rivers and creeks, but maybe also making it more available to a predator like an anaconda.

Two-toed sloths live in ever-wet tropical rainforests that are hot and humid. They tend to live in areas where there is a lot of vine growth so they can easily travel from tree to tree in the canopies of the forests. They mainly eat leaves, but there is lacking data on the extent of their diet due to their nocturnal lifestyle and camouflage.

See also

References

Gallery

Sloths
Mammals of Brazil
Mammals of Colombia
Mammals of French Guiana
Mammals of Guyana
Mammals of Peru
Mammals of Suriname
Mammals of Venezuela
Fauna of the Amazon
Mammals described in 1758
Taxa named by Carl Linnaeus